Phanoptis cyanomelas is a moth of the family Notodontidae first described by Cajetan and Rudolf Felder in 1874. It is found in Costa Rica, Panama, Colombia and Ecuador.

The forewings are completely hyaline (glass like) with no white scales in the transverse band. The dark areas of the wings are almost blue black, contrasting sharply with the transparent regions in between.

The larvae feed on Rinorea species.

References

Moths described in 1874
Notodontidae of South America